Vicor Corporation is a manufacturer of power modules headquartered in Andover, Massachusetts.

History and overview 
Vicor Corporation, incorporated in 1981 in Andover, Massachusetts, designs, manufactures, and markets modular power components and complete power systems. These are used in electronic products to convert power from a primary power source (typically either alternating current from a mains outlet or direct current from a battery) into the specific direct current required by electronic circuits. Vicor sells its products in North and South America, as well as internationally through independent distributors, to business-to-business (B2B) customers in computing, industrial equipment and automation, robotics, vehicles and transportation, unmanned aerial vehicles, satellites, and aerospace and defense.

Patrizio Vinciarelli is Vicor's chair of the board, president, and chief executive officer. As of 2022, Vicor had 11 subsidiaries, legally domiciled as follows: Vicor GmbH (Germany); VICR Securities Corporation (Massachusetts, USA); Vicor France SARL (France); Vicor Italy SRL (Italy); Vicor Hong Kong Ltd. (Hong Kong); Vicor U.K. Ltd. (United Kingdom); Vicor Japan Company Ltd. (Japan); Vicor KK (Japan); Vicor Trading (Shanghai) Limited (China); Vicor Development Corporation (Delaware, USA), including Freedom Power Systems, Inc. (Delaware, USA) and Northwest Power,Inc. (Delaware, USA); 560 Oakmead LLC (California, USA).

References

External links
 Vicor Corporation

Computer companies of the United States
Manufacturing companies based in Massachusetts
Companies established in 1981
Companies listed on the Nasdaq
Power supply manufacturers